Terrance Simien and the Zydeco Experience is a Zydeco band from Louisiana led by Terrance Simien.

Awards
Terrance Simien and the Zydeco Experience won a Grammy award for Best Zydeco or Cajun Music Album for their album Live! Worldwide.

Discography
Zydeco On the Bayou (Restless Records, 1990)
There's Room For Us All (Black Top Records, 1993)
Jam The Jazzfest (Valley Media, Inc, 1998)
Positively Beadhead (Tone Cool, 1999)
The Tribute Sessions  (AIM Records, 2004)
Creole For Kidz  (Beadhead Records, 2004)
Across the Parish Line (AIM Records, 2006)
Live! Worldwide (Aim Records, 2007)
Dockside Sessions (2014)

Band members

Current members
Stan Chambers - bass
Danny Williams - Keyboards, Musical Director
Ian Molinaro-Thompson - Drums
Lance Ellis - Saxophone
Curtis Watson - Trumpet

Former members
Mitch Marine
Richard Trahan
Eric Johanson
Dowell Davis
Taylor Gaurisco
Keith Sonnier
Russ Broussard
Jose Alvarez

References

Musical groups from Louisiana
Zydeco musicians